The 2003 IIHF World U18 Championship Division II was a pair of international under-18 ice hockey tournaments run by the International Ice Hockey Federation. The Division II tournaments made up the third level of competition at the 2003 IIHF World U18 Championships. The Group A tournament took place between 17 and 23 March 2003 in Tallinn, Estonia and the Group B tournament took place between 5 and 11 March 2003 in Belgrade, Federal Republic of Yugoslavia. South Korea and Romania won the Group A and Group B tournaments respectively and gained promotion to Division I for the 2004 IIHF World U18 Championships. While Bulgaria finished last in Group A and South Africa last in Group B and were both relegated to Division III for 2004.

Group A tournament
The Group A tournament began on 17 March 2003 in Tallinn, Estonia. Both Croatia and Estonia who missed promotion to Division I at the previous years World Championship returned to compete in this year's Division II tournament. Belgium, Bulgaria, South Korea and Spain all gained promotion to Division II from Division III following a restructure of the Division sizes which increased the number of teams in each group from four to six. South Korea won the tournament after winning all five of their games and gained promotion to Division I for the 2004 IIHF World U18 Championships. Estonia finished second losing only to South Korea and Croatia finished in third place. Bulgaria finished in last place after losing all five of their games and were relegated back to Division III for the 2004 IIHF World U18 Championships. Tomislav Grozaj of Croatia finished as the top scorer of the tournament with 27 points including 18 goals and nine assists. Thomas Tyson of Belgium finished the tournament as the leading goaltender based on save percentage.

Standings

Fixtures
All times local.

Scoring leaders
List shows the top ten skaters sorted by points, then goals.

Leading goaltenders
Only the top five goaltenders, based on save percentage, who have played 40% of their team's minutes are included in this list.

Group B tournament
The Group B tournament began on 5 March 2003 in Belgrade, Federal Republic of Yugoslavia. Hungary, Netherlands and Romania all returned to compete in the Division II tournament after missing promotion to Division I at the previous years World Championship. Lithuania, South Africa and Yugoslavia all gained promotion to Division II from Division III following a restructure of the Division sizes which increased the number of teams in each group from four to six. Romania won the tournament after winning all five of their games and gained promotion to Division I for the 2004 IIHF World U18 Championships. Hungary finished second after winning three games and drawing a fourth and the Netherlands finished in third place. South Africa finished in last place after losing all five of their games and were relegated back to Division III for the 2004 IIHF World U18 Championships. The tournament was also the last appearance of Yugoslavia's under-18 team as the country was reconstituted as the State Union of Serbia and Montenegro. The Yugoslavia men's under-18 team was replaced the following year by the Serbia and Montenegro men's national under-18 ice hockey team. Tivadar Petres of Romania finished as the top scorer of the tournament with 17 points including 11 goals and six assists. Hungary's Dominik Vinnai finished the tournament as the leading goaltender based on save percentage.

Standings

Fixtures
All times local.

Scoring leaders
List shows the top ten skaters sorted by points, then goals.

Leading goaltenders
Only the top five goaltenders, based on save percentage, who have played 40% of their team's minutes are included in this list.

References

IIHF
IIHF World U18 Championship Division II
II
International ice hockey competitions hosted by Estonia
International ice hockey competitions hosted by Yugoslavia
IIHF World U18 Championship Division II
International ice hockey competitions hosted by Serbia
World
World